Computerized system validation (CSV) (usually referred to as "Computer Systems Validation") is the process of testing/validating/qualifying a regulated (E.g., FDA 21CFR11) computerized system to ensure that it does exactly what it is designed to do in a consistent and reproducible manner that is as safe, secure and reliable as paper records. This is widely used in the Pharmaceutical, Life Sciences and BioTech industries and is a cousin of Software Testing but with a more formal and documented approach. 
The validation process begins with the system proposal/requirements definition and continues until system retirement and retention of the e-records based on regulatory rules.

Similarly, The Rules Governing Medicinal Products in the European Union, Volume 4, Annex 11: Computerised Systems applies to all forms of computerised systems used as part of a GMP regulated activities and defines Computer System Validation Elements

System requirement
Documented system requirements are required for CSV as they clearly stipulate the intended use of a computer system application. System requirements are gathered and documented in the system definition phase. System definition artifacts that reflect these requirements can include, but are not limited to, the following:
 User Requirements Specification: Specifies required aims of the system. As opposed to specifying nice-to-have aims of the system.
 Hardware Requirements Specification: Minimum hardware required to support the system.

See also
 Software testing
 Software engineering
 List of software engineering topics
 Quality assurance

References

External links
 Guidance Compliance Regulatory Information

EU GMP Annex 11: Computerised Systems

Quality control
Software quality